A range of men's and women's rowing events took place at the 2003 Pan American Games in Santo Domingo in August 2003.

Men's events

Women's events

Events at the 2003 Pan American Games
2003
2003 in rowing
Pan American Games